Mai Grage (born 18 April 1992) is a Danish former professional tennis player.

She has a WTA career-high singles ranking of 861, achieved on 13 April 2015, and a WTA career-high doubles ranking of 988, set on 29 November 2010. Grage reached a junior career-high ranking of 30 and the 2010 French Open girls' doubles semifinals.

She made her WTA main-draw debut at the 2010 Danish Open in the doubles draw where she partnered Karen Barbat, losing in the first round. Grage then made further appearances in WTA main doubles draws in 2011 and 2012.

Playing for Denmark in Fed Cup, Grage achieved a win–loss record of 14–16.

ITF Circuit finals

Singles: 1 (title)

Doubles: 1 (runner-up)

Fed Cup participation

Singles

Doubles

References

External links
 
 
 

1992 births
Living people
Danish female tennis players
People from Kongens Lyngby
Tennis players at the 2010 Summer Youth Olympics
Sportspeople from the Capital Region of Denmark